Brenania is a genus of flowering plants in the family Rubiaceae. It is found from Nigeria to Cameroon, Gabon, Cabinda, Central African Republic, Congo, and D.R.Congo. The genus was described in 1958 and contained only the type species Brenania spathulifolia (now considered a synonym of B. brieyi, although per ICN B. spathulifolia retains its status as type).

Species
 Brenania brieyi (De Wild.) E.M.A.Petit - Nigeria, Cabinda, Central African Republic, Cameroon, Gabon, Congo, D.R.Congo
 Brenania rhomboideifolia E.M.A.Petit - D.R.Congo

References

External links
Kew World Checklist of Selected Plant Species, Brenania

Rubiaceae genera
Gardenieae
Flora of Africa
Taxa named by Ronald William John Keay